David Paul Briggs (born March 16, 1943 in Killen, Alabama, United States)  is an American keyboardist, record producer, arranger, composer, and studio owner. Briggs is one of an elite core of Nashville studio musicians known as "the Nashville Cats" and has been featured in a major exhibition by the Country Music Hall of Fame in 2015. He played his first recording session at the age of 14 and has gone on to add keyboards to a plethora of pop, rock, and country artists, as well as recording hundreds of corporate commercials.

Career
In May 1966, he was given the opportunity of recording on sessions for Elvis Presley's album How Great Thou Art when Floyd Cramer was running late. Briggs continued to record and tour with Presley until February 1977.

Briggs and Norbert Putnam opened Quadrafonic Studios in the late 1960s. It was sold in 1976 and Briggs opened House of David.

Briggs was a recording artist on Decca, Polydor and Monument records in the mid to late 1960s and member of the band Area Code 615 from 1969-1971.

Artists he has worked with include Elvis Presley, Dean Martin, Joan Baez, Nancy Sinatra, B.B. King, Johnny Cash, Dolly Parton,  Waylon Jennings, Tony Joe White, George Harrison, Todd Rundgren, Roy Orbison, The Monkees, J. J. Cale, Kris Kristofferson, Alice Cooper, Charley Pride and many others.

Briggs was inducted into the Alabama Music Hall of Fame in 1999.

Briggs was inducted into the Musicians Hall of Fame and Museum in 2019.

Collaborations

References

External links
Alabama Music Hall of Fame 
Elvis Presley's TCB Band
Discogs.com

1943 births
Living people
People from Killen, Alabama
20th-century American pianists
American organists
20th-century American keyboardists
Record producers from Alabama
TCB Band members
Musicians from Alabama
Decca Records artists
Polydor Records artists
Monument Records artists
Musicians from Nashville, Tennessee